Stanisław Marian Hachorek (21 January 1927 in Czeladź – 24 October 1988 in Warsaw), was a Polish football player and coach.

Hachorek, who began playing football in 1945 in CKS Czeladz, spent best years of his career in Gwardia Warszawa, a team that in the 1950s was among top Polish sides. Between 1955 and 1960, he capped sixteen times for Poland, scoring eight goals. He debuted on 29 May 1955 in Bucharest, scoring a goal in a 2-2 tie with Romania. In the same year, he became top goalscorer of the Ekstraklasa, with sixteen goals. Hachorek participated in the 1960 Summer Olympics in Rome, where he scored a goal in Poland's 6-1 victory with Tunisia.

He spent last years of his career in Warszawianka Warszawa, and after retirement from active playing (1965), became a coach.

References

External links
 Players of Poland's national team

1927 births
1988 deaths
Polish footballers
Poland international footballers
Olympic footballers of Poland
Footballers at the 1960 Summer Olympics
Ekstraklasa players
People from Czeladź
Gwardia Warsaw players
Sportspeople from Silesian Voivodeship
Association football forwards
KS Warszawianka players